Jaan Marbu Ka is a Bhojpuri music album of artist and producer Dinesh Agrahari Deewana, Mamta Sharma and Indu Sonali presented under the banner of Jhinka Film Production.

Songs 
Below is the list of songs from the album

 Jaan Marbu Ka
 Saanvar Goriya
 Jab Jab Yaad Aave
 International Bank
 Laange Na Manva
 Ho Gail Vivah
 Khaa Khub Saani Saani
 Sainya Chhod Khetbaari
 Shahari Style Waali

Soundtrack 
The soundtrack of album has been composed and programmed by Dinesh Agrahari Deewana himself.
All lyrics written by Dinesh Agrahari Deewana, Ashok Sinha, Vishal Nishad, Fanidra Rao, Ramesh Raj Maurya.

References 

2011 albums
Albums by Indian artists